The Gwent Central League  is a football league covering the central part of the preserved county of Gwent. It is affiliated to the Gwent County Football Association. The leagues are at the seventh and eighth levels of the Welsh football league system.

Divisions
The league is composed of two divisions.

Member clubs 2022–23

First Division

Clydach Wasps (reserves)
Fairfield United 
Forgeside 
Mardy (reserves)
New Inn (reserves)
Pontnewynydd 
Pontypool Town
Race 
Tranch
Usk Town (reserves)

Second Division

Blaenavon Blues (thirds) 
Crickhowell (reserves)
Cwmffrwdoer Sports (reserves)
Fairfield United (reserves) (withdrew Jul 22)
Forgeside (reserves)
PILCS (reserves)
Pontnewynydd (reserves) 
Prescoed

Promotion and relegation
The league features other teams of clubs with representation at higher levels of the Welsh football pyramid. Promotion from the First Division is to the Gwent County League Division Two may be possible if a team is eligible.

Champions - Top Division

1960–61: – Blaenavon Blues
1961–62: – Blaenavon Blues
1966–67: – Blaenavon Blues
1980–81: – Usk
1981–82: – Race
1982–83: – Tranch
1983–84: – ICI
1984–85: – Llanfoist 
1985–86: – Fibreglass 
1986–87: – Trevethin 
1987–88: – Sebastopol 
1988–89: – Panteg
1989–90: – Llanfoist
1990–91: – Llanfoist
1991–92: – Llanfoist 
1992–93: – Blaenavon Blues
1993–94: – Mardy
1994–95: – Owens Corning
1995–96: – Clydach Wasps
1996–97: – Blaenavon Blues
1997–98: – Goytre
1998–99: – Crickhowell 
1999–00: – Trevethin 
2000–01: – Govilon 
2001–02: – Govilon
2002–03: – Pilcs
2003–04: – Sebastopol
2004–05: – Crickhowell 
2005–06: – Tranch
2006–07: – Govilon
2007–08: – Trevethin 
2008–09: – Trevethin 
2009–10: – Trevethin 
2010–11: – Llanarth  
2011–12: – Panteg 
2012–13: – Llanarth
2013–14: – Wainfelin Bluebirds
2014–15: – Penygarn & Trevethin 
2015–16: – Crickhowell
2016–17: – Usk Town
2017–18: – Tranch
2018–19: – Gilwern and District
2019–20: – Cwmffrwdoer Sports
2020–21: – Season cancelled due to Covid-19 pandemic
2021–22: – Mardy

Cup Competitions
This league currently runs three different knock out cup competitions for its member clubs:

Open Cup: All league teams (from both Division One & Two) are eligible to compete in this competition - which is the league's premier knockout cup competition.

Langdon Cup: All Division One teams are eligible to compete in this cup competition.

Benevolent Cup: All Division Two teams are eligible to compete in this cup competition.

List Of All Open Cup Winners Since 1980 - 81 Season:

1980 - 81:  -  Usk Town

1981 - 82:  -  Race

1982 - 83:  -  ICI Sports

1983 - 84:  -  ICI Sports

1984 - 85:  -  Clydach Wasps

1985 - 86:  -  New Inn United

1986 - 87:  -  Usk Town

1987 - 88:  -  Panteg

1988 - 89:  -  Abergavenny Thursdays

1989 - 90:  -  Abergavenny Thursdays

1990 - 91:  -  Pontypool Town

1991 - 92:  -  Llanfoist

1992 - 93:  -  Blaenavon Blues

1993 - 94:  -  Fairfield

1994 - 95:  -  Llanarth

1995 - 96:  -  Fairfield United

1996 - 97:  -  Pontypool Town

1997 - 98:  -  Crickhowell

1998 - 99:  -  Crickhowell

1999 - 00:  -  Govilon

2000 - 01:  -  Govilon

2001 - 02:  -  Govilon

2002 - 03:  -  PILCS

2003 - 04:  -  Gilwern & District

2004 - 05:  -  (Competition Abandoned)

2005 - 06:  -  Blaenavon Blues

2006 - 07:  -  Govilon

2007 - 08:  -  Clydach Wasps

2008 - 09:  -  Trevethin

2009 - 10:  -  Llanarth

2010 - 11:  -  Govilon

2011 - 12:  -  Usk Town

2012 - 13:  -  (Competition Abandoned)

2013 - 14:  -  Gilwern & District

2014 - 15:  -  Penygarn & Trevethin

2015 - 16:  -  Usk Town

2016 - 17:  -  Tranch

2017 - 18:  -  Tranch

2018 - 19:  -  Blaenavon Blues

2019 - 20:  -  (Competition Abandoned Due To Covid-19)

2020 - 21:  -  (Competition Cancelled Due To Covid-19)

2021 - 22:  -  Pontypool Town

List Of All Langdon Cup Winners Since 1980 - 81 Season:

1980 - 81:  -  Race

1981 - 82:  -  Sebastopol

1982 - 83:  -  Tranch

1983 - 84:  -  ICI Sports

1984 - 85:  -  Griffithstown

1985 - 86:  -  Trevethin

1986 - 87:  -  Mardy

1987 - 88:  -  Sebastopol

1988 - 89:  -  Panteg

1989 - 90:  -  Clydach Wasps

1990 - 91:  -  Llanfoist

1991 - 92:  -  New Inn

1992 - 93:  -  Goytre

1993 - 94:  -  Goytre

1994 - 95:  -  Pontypool Town

1995 - 96:  -  Fairfield United

1996 - 97:  -  Goytre

1997 - 98:  -  Goytre

1998 - 99:  -  Pontypool Town

1999 - 00:  -  Owens Corning

2000 - 01:  -  Govilon

2001 - 02:  -  Owens Corning

2002 - 03:  -  Usk Town

2003 - 04:  -  Llanarth

2004 - 05:  -  Blaenavon Blues

2005 - 06:  -  Goytre

2006 - 07:  -  Clydach Wasps

2007 - 08:  -  Trevethin

2008 - 09:  -  Goytre

2009 - 10:  -  Trevethin

2010 - 11:  -  Llanarth

2011 - 12:  -  Llanarth

2012 - 13:  -  Llanarth

2013 - 14:  -  Crickhowell

2014 - 15:  -  Gilwern & District

2015 - 16:  -  Gilwern & District

2016 - 17:  -  Usk Town

2017 - 18:  -  Tranch

2018 - 19:  -  Pontypool Town

2019 - 20:  -  (Competition Abandoned Due To Covid-19)

2020 - 21:  -  (Competition Cancelled Due To Covid-19)

2021 - 22:  -  Mardy

List Of All Benevolent Cup Winners Since 1980 - 81 Season:

1980 - 81:  -  Griffithstown

1981 - 82:  -  Teazer

1982 - 83:  -  Usk

1983 - 84:  -  Rangers

1984 - 85:  -  Bailey Park Rangers

1985 - 86:  -  Fairfield

1986 - 87:  -  Gilwern & District

1987 - 88:  -  Kings Head

1988 - 89:  -  Gilwern & District

1989 - 90:  -  Race

1990 - 91:  -  New Inn

1991 - 92:  -  Little Mill

1992 - 93:  -  Govilon United

1993 - 94:  -  Mardy

1994 - 95:  -  Owens Corning B

1995 - 96:  -  Blaenavon Blues B

1996 - 97:  -  Waterloo

1997 - 98:  -  Clydach Wasps

1998 - 99:  -  Llanarth B

1999 - 00:  -  Trevethin Old Boys

2000 - 01:  -  Owens Corning B

2001 - 02:  -  Trevethin Old Boys

2002 - 03:  -  Blaenavon Blues B

2003 - 04:  -  Blaenavon Blues B

2004 - 05:  -  Crickhowell B

2005 - 06:  -  Pandy

2006 - 07:  -  Fairfield United

2007 - 08:  -  Pontypool Town

2008 - 09:  -  Clydach Wasps

2009 - 10:  -  Clydach Wasps

2010 - 11:  -  Clydach Wasps

2011 - 12:  -  Cwmffrwdoer

2012 - 13:  -  Wainfelin Bluebirds

2013 - 14:  -  Gilwern & District

2014 - 15:  -  Crickhowell B

2015 - 16:  -  Gilwern & District B

2016 - 17:  -  Fairfield United

2017 - 18:  -  Blaenavon Blues B

2018 - 19:  -  Mardy

2019 - 20:  -  (Competition Abandoned Due To Covid-19)

2020 - 21:  -  (Competition Cancelled Due To Covid-19)

2021 - 22:  -  Tranch

References

8